The NASA-ISRO Synthetic Aperture Radar (NISAR) mission is a joint project between NASA and ISRO to co-develop and launch a dual-frequency synthetic aperture radar on an Earth observation satellite. The satellite will be the first radar imaging satellite to use dual frequencies. It will be used for remote sensing, to observe and understand natural processes on Earth. For example, its left-facing instruments will study the Antarctic cryosphere. With a total cost estimated at US$1.5 billion, NISAR is likely to be the world's most expensive Earth-imaging satellite.

Overview 
The NASA-ISRO Synthetic Aperture Radar, or NISAR satellite, will use advanced radar imaging to map the elevation of Earth's land and ice masses 4 to 6 times a month at resolutions of 5 to 10 meters. It is designed to observe and measure some of the planet's most complex natural processes, including ecosystem disturbances, ice-sheet collapse, and natural hazards such as earthquakes, tsunamis, volcanoes and landslides.

The mission is a partnership between NASA and ISRO. Under the terms of the agreement, NASA will provide the mission's L-band synthetic aperture radar (SAR), a high-rate telecommunication subsystem for scientific data GPS receivers, a solid-state recorder, and a payload data subsystem. ISRO will provide the satellite bus, an S-band synthetic aperture radar, the launch vehicle, and associated launch services.

All data from NISAR would be freely available 1 to 2 days after observation and within hours in case of emergencies like natural disasters. Data collected from NISAR will reveal information about the evolution and state of Earth's crust, help scientists better understand our planet's natural processes and changing climate, and aid future resource and hazard management.

The satellite will be three-axis stabilized. It will use a  deployable mesh antenna and will operate on both the L- and S- microwave bands. The aperture mesh reflector (antenna) will be supplied by Astro Aerospace, a Northrop Grumman company.

The satellite will be launched from India aboard a GSLV in Q1 of 2024. The orbit will be a Sun-synchronous, dawn-to-dusk type. The planned mission life is three years. The project has passed the first stage of the design validation phase and has been reviewed and approved by NASA.

Payload 
 L-band (1.25 GHz; 24 cm wavelength ) polarimetric SAR, to be produced by NASA.
 S-band (3.20 GHz; 9.3 cm wavelength ) polarimetric SAR, to be produced by ISRO.

See also 

 Earth observation satellite
 Indian Remote Sensing
 List of Indian satellites
 Seasat
 Shuttle Radar Topography Mission

References 

ISRO satellites
NASA satellites
India–United States relations
2024 in spaceflight
Synthetic aperture radar satellites